Chandrapur is one of the 90 Legislative Assembly constituencies of Chhattisgarh state in India. It is in Janjgir-Champa district.

Previously, Chandrapur was part of Madhya Pradesh Legislative Assembly until state of Chhattisgarh was created, in 2000.

Member of Legislative Assembly

Madhya Pradesh Legislative Assembly 
 1977: Bhawani Lal Verma, Indian National Congress
 1980: Bhawani Lal Verma, Indian National Congress
 1985: Bhawani Lal Verma, Indian National Congress
 1990: Dushyant Kumar Singh Judev, Bharatiya Janata Party
 1993: Nobel Kumar Verma, Indian National Congress
 1998: Rani Ratnamala Devi, Bharatiya Janata Party

Chhattisgarh Legislative Assembly

Election results

2018

See also
 Janjgir-Champa district
 List of constituencies of Chhattisgarh Legislative Assembly

References

Janjgir-Champa district
Assembly constituencies of Chhattisgarh